SAS Wingfield is a South African Navy base, on the site of the World War II Wingfield Aerodrome in Cape Town.

History
SAS Wingfield was established in 1961 to provide technical training and practical instruction to apprentices, but now offers training to officers and sailors.

References

Installations of the South African Navy
Wingfield